Ilio DiPaolo (November 7, 1926 – May 10, 1995), was an Italian professional wrestler and restaurateur who lived in the Buffalo, New York area.

Professional wrestling career
DiPaolo was born in Italy and lived there until he moved to Venezuela in 1949. There, he met promoter Toots Mondt, who taught him to wrestle. While waiting to get the proper paperwork to move to the United States, he relocated to the Dominican Republic to wrestle in the meantime. After the paperwork was completed, he moved to Buffalo, New York in 1951. He then began to work for Frank Tunney out of the Toronto area. Around this time he teamed with Whipper Billy Watson to win the NWA Canadian Open Tag Team Championship. Also in Toronto, he wrestled Pat O'Connor for the NWA World title in 1959, but the match went to a one-hour time limit draw. His last match was against Lou Thesz for the same title; a match that also went to a one-hour time limit draw.

Personal life
DiPaolo met his wife Ethel, stepdaughter of promoter Pedro Martinez, in 1952. The couple had four children.

He opened his first restaurant, a pizzeria, when he was in his 40s, but it was destroyed by a fire. DiPaolo retired from wrestling full-time in 1965 and opened his second restaurant, an eponymous Italian restaurant now known as "Ilio DiPaolo's" in Blasdell, New York. He died in 1995 after being struck by a car during a torrential downpour while trying to enter a restaurant with his wife. After his death, DiPaolo's oldest son Dennis began to run the restaurant. His other children also worked in the restaurant.

World Championship Wrestling held the Ilio DiPaolo Memorial Show for DiPaolo from 1996 through 1999. To this point over $750,000 has been raised for the Ilio DiPaolo Scholarship Fund and for other Buffalo charities like Children's Hospital and People Inc.

DiPaolo was selected as a New York State Award recipient by the Professional Wrestling Hall of Fame and Museum in 2003. The DiPaolo family has also been inducted into the New York Chapter of the National Wrestling Hall of Fame for the creation of the Ilio DiPaolo Scholarship fund and continual contribution to high school wrestling.

Championships and accomplishments
Big Time Wrestling
BTW World Tag Team Championship (1 time) - with Buddy Lee

Cauliflower Alley Club
Other honoree (1994)

Greater Buffalo Sports Hall of Fame
1996 inductee

Maple Leaf Wrestling
NWA Canadian Open Tag Team Championship (5 times) - with Whipper Billy Watson (4) and Billy Red Lyons (1)

Midwest Wrestling Association
MWA Ohio Heavyweight Championship (3 times)
MWA Ohio Tag Team Championship (1 time) - with Athol Layton

Professional Wrestling Hall of Fame and Museum
New York State Award (2003)

Worldwide Wrestling Associates
WWA International Television Tag Team Championship (1 time) - with Tex McKenzie

Stampede Wrestling
NWA Canadian Tag Team Championship (Calgary version) (1 time) - with Tex McKenzie
Stampede Wrestling Hall of Fame (Class of 1995)

References

External links
Canadian Wrestling Hall of Fame - Profile
Ilio DiPaolo's Restaurant and Ringside Lounge

1926 births
1995 deaths
20th-century professional wrestlers
Italian male professional wrestlers
American professional wrestlers of Italian descent
Professional Wrestling Hall of Fame and Museum
Stampede Wrestling alumni
NWA Canadian Open Tag Team Champions
NWA Canadian Tag Team Champions (Calgary version)